Ohio is home to many professional and college sports teams. The metropolitan areas of Cleveland, Cincinnati, and Columbus are home to major league professional sports teams in baseball, basketball, football, hockey, and soccer.

Major league sports teams
Ohio is home to major professional sports teams in baseball, basketball, football, hockey, soccer, lacrosse, and rugby union. The state's major professional sporting teams include: Cincinnati Reds (Major League Baseball), Cleveland Guardians (Major League Baseball), Cincinnati Bengals (National Football League), Cleveland Browns (National Football League), Cleveland Cavaliers (National Basketball Association), Columbus Blue Jackets (National Hockey League), Columbus Crew (Major League Soccer), and FC Cincinnati (Major League Soccer).

Ohio played a central role in the development of both Major League Baseball and the National Football League.  Baseball's first fully professional team, the Cincinnati Red Stockings of 1869, were organized in Ohio. An informal early 20th century American football association, the Ohio League, was the direct predecessor of the NFL, although neither of Ohio's modern NFL franchises trace their roots to an Ohio League club.  The Pro Football Hall of Fame is located in Canton.

Ohio teams have won seven World Series (five for Cincinnati Reds, two for Cleveland Guardians), nine NFL Championships (four for Cleveland Browns, two for Canton Bulldogs, one for Cleveland Rams, one for Akron Pros, one for Cleveland Bulldogs), one NBA Finals (Cleveland Cavaliers), four AAFC Championships (Cleveland Browns), and two MLS Cups (Columbus Crew).

Minor league teams
On a smaller scale, Ohio hosts minor league baseball, arena football, indoor football, mid-level hockey, and lower division soccer.

The minor league baseball teams include Triple-A East's Columbus Clippers (affiliated with the Cleveland Guardians) and Toledo Mud Hens (affiliated with the Detroit Tigers), Double-A Northeast's Akron RubberDucks (affiliated with the Guardians) and the High-A Central's Dayton Dragons (affiliated with the Cincinnati Reds) and Lake County Captains (affiliated with the Guardians). The Mahoning Valley Scrappers were also affiliated with the former Indians, playing the New York–Penn League before the 2021 Minor League Baseball reorganization and became a founding member of the MLB Draft League. Additionally, the Lake Erie Crushers play in the independent Frontier League.

Ohio's minor professional football teams include: Canton Legends 2005-2008 (American Indoor Football Association), Cincinnati Marshals 2005-2007 (National Indoor Football League), Cincinnati Sizzle (Women's Football Alliance), Cleveland Fusion (Women's Football Alliance), Cleveland Gladiators (Arena Football League), Columbus Comets (Women's Football Alliance), Mahoning Valley Thunder 2006-2009 (af2), Marion Mayhem 2006-2010 (Continental Indoor Football League), and Miami Valley Silverbacks 2006-2012 (Continental Indoor Football League).

Ohio's minor league hockey teams include: Cleveland Monsters (American Hockey League), Cincinnati Cyclones (ECHL), and the Toledo Walleye (ECHL).

Ohio’s minor league basketball teams include: Cleveland Charge (NBA G League) and Burning River Buckets, (American Basketball Association)

Ohio has been home to teams in many lower-division soccer leagues. The second-level USL Championship (USLC) currently has no teams in the state, but has had Ohio teams in the past. The Dayton Dutch Lions played in the league, then known as USL Pro, from 2011 to 2014, after which it moved to the league then known as the Premier Development League and now as USL League Two (USL2), where it remains today. From 2016 to 2018, FC Cincinnati played in the USLC, then known as the United Soccer League, before being replaced by the current MLS team of the same name. The aforementioned Dayton Dutch Lions are the only current USL2 team that plays in Ohio. A second current USL2 team, the Cincinnati Dutch Lions, played home games in Cincinnati from 2014 to 2016, but now plays at Northern Kentucky University. Other past Ohio teams in USL2 are the Cincinnati Riverhawks (1997), Cincinnati Kings (2008–2012), Cleveland Internationals (2004–2010), Dayton Gemini (2000–2002), and Toledo Slayers (2003–2005). Ohio also has Cleveland SC, FC Columbus, and Toledo Villa FC of the National Premier Soccer League, and Columbus Eagles FC, Cleveland Ambassadors, and Cincinnati Sirens FC of the Women's Premier Soccer League. Two teams play for MLS Next Pro, FC Cincinnati 2 and Columbus Crew 2.

Ohio is also home to the Cleveland Comets, a minor professional softball club, of National Pro Fastpitch.

Baseball

Basketball

Football

Ice hockey

Association football (soccer)

Individual sports

Notable drivers from Ohio include Mauri Rose, Frank Lockhart, Ted Horn, Bobby Rahal, Sam Hornish Jr. and Tim Richmond. The Mid-Ohio Sports Car Course has hosted several auto racing championships, including CART World Series, IndyCar Series, NASCAR Xfinity Series, Can-Am, Formula 5000, IMSA GT Championship, American Le Mans Series and Rolex Sports Car Series.

The Grand Prix of Cleveland also hosted CART races from 1982 to 2007. The Eldora Speedway is a major dirt oval that hosts NASCAR Truck Series, World of Outlaws Sprint Cars and USAC Silver Crown Series races.

Ohio has several short ovals, including Eldora Speedway and Toledo Speedway. Notable dragstrips in Ohio include the National Trail Raceway and the Summit Motorsports Park.

Ohio hosts two PGA Tour events, the WGC-Bridgestone Invitational and Memorial Tournament. Columbus native Jack Nicklaus won 18 major golf tournaments, whereas Urbana native Pete Dye is a prominent golf course architect.

The Cincinnati Masters is an ATP World Tour Masters 1000 and WTA Premier 5 tennis tournament.

Major annual events

Former professional teams

Former major league teams:
 Akron Pros (NFL) (1920–1925)
 Canton Bulldogs (NFL) (1920–1923; 1925–1926)
 Portsmouth Spartans (NFL) (1930–1933)
 Cincinnati Red Stockings (NL) (1876–1880)
 Cleveland Blues (NL) (1879–1884)
 Cleveland Spiders (AA-NL) (1887–1899)
 Cleveland Rams (NFL) (1936–1945)
 Cleveland Rebels (BAA) (1946–1947)
 Cincinnati Royals (NBA) (1957–1972)
 Cleveland Barons (NHL) (1976–1978)
 Cleveland Crusaders (WHA)(1972–1976)
 Cincinnati Stingers (WHA) (1975–1979).
 Dayton Triangles (NFL) (1920–1929)
 Cleveland Rockers (WNBA) (1997–2003)
 Columbus Destroyers (AFL) (2004–2008; 2019)
 Cincinnati Marshals (National Indoor Football League) (2005-2007)
 Mahoning Valley Thunder (af2) (2006-2009)
 Miami Valley Silverbacks (Continental Indoor Football League) (2006-2012)

Collegiate sports
Ohio has eight NCAA Division I FBS college football teams, divided among three different conferences. It has also experienced considerable success in the secondary and tertiary tiers of college football divisions.

In FBS, representing the Big Ten, the Ohio State Buckeyes football team ranks 5th among all-time winningest programs, with eight national championships and seven Heisman Trophy winners.  Their biggest rivals are the Michigan Wolverines, whom they traditionally play each year as the last game of their regular season schedule.

Ohio is one of only two states to have two colleges to appear in the College Football Playoffs. Ohio State appeared in 2014, 2016, 2019, and 2020 while Cincinnati  appeared in 2021. Of those Ohio State was the only one to win the National Championship in 2014. The Cincinnati Bearcats represent the state in the American Athletic Conference; they will move to the Big 12 Conference in 2023.

Ohio has six teams represented in the Mid-American Conference: the Akron Zips, Bowling Green Falcons, Kent State Golden Flashes, Miami RedHawks, Ohio Bobcats and Toledo Rockets. The MAC headquarters are in Cleveland.

The Youngstown State Penguins have been a perennial power at the Division I FCS level in the Missouri Valley Football Conference, having won four FCS titles.

In NCAA Division III, the Mount Union Purple Raiders boast a record-setting 13 national championships, most recently in 2017. Since 1996, the Purple Raiders have advanced to the Division III title game in all but three seasons, and appeared in 11 consecutive title games (2005–2015). They also boast two record winning streaks for D-III—55 straight wins overall from 2000 to 2003, and 112 straight regular-season wins from 2005 to 2016 (the latter breaking the school's own record of 110, set from 1994 to 2005).

Division I Universities

Stadiums and arenas

 Former venues
 Cleveland Stadium (1931-1995; capacity: 83,000) – Cleveland Indians and Cleveland Browns
 Riverfront Stadium (1970-2002; capacity: 59,754) – Cincinnati Bengals and Cincinnati Reds
 Richfield Coliseum (1973–1994; capacity 20,273) – Cleveland Cavaliers, Cleveland Barons, and many others
 Cincinnati Gardens (1949–2016; capacity 10,208) – Cincinnati Royals, Cincinnati Bearcats, Xavier Musketeers, Cincinnati Cyclones, and many others

Gallery

See also
Sports in Cincinnati
Sports in Cleveland

References

External links